Anwar Hayat Khan is a Pakistani politician who was a member of the Provincial Assembly of Khyber Pakhtunkhwa from May 2013 to May 2018 and from August 2018 to January 2023 belonging to the Jamiat Ulema-e-Islam (F). He also served as a member of different committees.

Political career 
Anwar Hayat Khan was elected to the Khyber Pakhtunkhwa assembly's PK-74 Lakki Marwat-I seat on the ticket of (Jamiat Ulama-e-Islam (F) in 2013 General Elections. He was re-elected in the 2018 General Elections on the ticket of Muttahida Majlis-e-Amal (a political alliance consisting of conservative, Islamist, religious, and far-right parties).

References

Living people
Pashtun people
Jamiat Ulema-e-Islam (F) politicians
Khyber Pakhtunkhwa MPAs 2013–2018
People from Lakki Marwat District
Muttahida Majlis-e-Amal MPAs (Khyber Pakhtunkhwa)
Year of birth missing (living people)